This World Alone is a 2018 science fiction drama film directed by Jordan Noel and written by Hudson Phillips. The film stars Belle Adams, Lau'rie Roach, Carrie Walrond Hood, Sophie Edwards, and Brandon O'Dell.

Plot 
Three women are forced to survive once a cataclysmic event wipes out power all over the world.

Cast 

 Belle Adams as Sam
 Lau'rie Roach as Dart
 Carrie Walrond Hood as Connie
 Sophie Edwards as Willow
 Brandon O'Dell as Levi

Production 
Principal photography of the film was shot over ten days for $30,000 in Hiawassee, Georgia.

Release 

This World Alone premiered at Rome Film Festival in 2018, screened at Phoenix Film Festival in 2019 and released on May 18, 2021. It was distributed by 1091 Pictures.

Reception 
Elisabeth Vincentelli at The New York Times said the film is "quietly thought-provoking." Trent Neely at Battle Royale With Cheese claims it has "some new perspectives in the post-apocalyptic genre." In a review at Moviejawn, Audrey Callerstrom said the ending falls apart and that the script and characters could be more polished. Jessica Baxter at Hammer to Nail mentioned that the film is excellent, but that the tone of the film drags. Film critic Dennis Schwartz gave the film a C+, stating "it needed more of something urgent to get me along for the journey." Rachel Willis at UK Film Review gave it two stars, claiming the score and cinematography are the highlights. The film won Best Narrative Feature at Oxford Film Festival in 2019.

References

External links 
 
 
 

2018 science fiction films
American science fiction drama films
2010s science fiction drama films
American post-apocalyptic films
Films shot in Georgia (U.S. state)
Films set in Georgia (U.S. state)
1091 Pictures films
American survival films
2010s survival films
Films about women in the United States
Films featuring an all-female cast